Extreme Fighting Championship (EFC) is a South African mixed martial arts promotion company established since 2009. It is the largest MMA promotion company on the continent of Africa and features on its roster professional fighters from across the world including the United States, Europe, South America, the UK, Australia, and Africa. The organization produces 10 live events annually. They currently have over 120 athletes exclusively contracted to the organisation.  EFC events are currently broadcast in over 120 countries around the world on numerous television networks in multiple languages. To date, EFC has held 85 events and presided over approximately 982 matches.

History
EFC was founded in 2009 by brothers Cairo Howarth, Silas Howarth, and Calvin Howarth who are the present owners and along with Graeme Cartmell, who is the Vice President of Talent and Matchmaker, are the key people in the company. Prior to 2009, the Howarth brothers were great admirers of the UFC and would regularly watch UFC events through pay per view channels. This inspired them to create an African-based MMA promotion company modelled on the UFC which they named Extreme Fighting Championship (EFC). EFC's inaugural event took place at the Ticketpro Dome (formerly the Coca-Cola Dome) in Johannesburg, South Africa on November 10, 2009. The first 7 events took place at the Ticketpro Dome in Johannesburg. From the 8th event in 2011 onwards, the organization held events in other major cities throughout South Africa which to date includes Cape Town, Durban, Carnival City Casino, Sun City Casino, Pretoria and Johannesburg. When the demand to watch EFC events grew, they signed television broadcasting and streaming deals with a number of media organizations throughout the world. Today EFC has broadcasting deals in place with Multichoice Supersport, SABC Sport, Uganda Broadcasting Corporation, CSI Sports, DAZN, Best4Sport, and  IB Sports.

Rules

Extreme Fighting Championship's rules are based upon the Unified Rules of Mixed Martial Arts. All bouts are contested over three, five-minute rounds, with the exception of five-round championship bouts. There is a one-minute rest period between rounds. As per the Unified Rules of MMA, Extreme Fighting Championship only allows competitors to fight in approved shorts, without shoes or any other sort of foot padding. Fighters must use approved light gloves (4-6 ounces) that allow fingers to grab. The referee has the right to stop the fighters and stand them up if they reach a stalemate on the ground (where neither are in a dominant position nor working toward one) after a verbal warning.

Match outcome
Matches usually end via:
Submission: a fighter taps on the mat or his opponent three times (or more) or verbally submits.
Knockout: a fighter falls from a legal blow and is either unconscious or unable to immediately continue.
Technical Knockout: stoppage of the fight by the referee if it is determined a fighter cannot "intelligently defend" himself or by ringside doctor due to injury.
Judges' Decision: Depending on scoring, a match may end as:
unanimous decision (all three judges score a win for one fighter),
split decision (two judges score a win for one fighter with the third for the other),
majority decision (two judges score a win for one fighter with one for a draw),
unanimous draw (all three judges score a draw),
majority draw (two judges score a draw).
split draw (the total points for each fighter is equal)

A fight can also end in a technical decision, technical draw, disqualification, forfeit or no contest.

Judging criteria
The ten-point must system is used for all EFC bouts; three judges score each round and the winner of each receives ten points, the loser nine points or less. If the round is even, both fighters receive ten points. The decision is announced at the end of the match, but the judge's scorecards are not announced.

Fouls
The following are considered fouls in EFC bouts:

 Butting with the head.
 Eye gouging of any kind.
 Biting.
 Hair pulling.
 Groin attacks of any kind.
 Fish hooking, gouging as in self-defense and some martial arts.
 Putting a finger into any orifice or into any cut or laceration on an opponent.
 Small joint manipulation.
 Striking to the spine or the back of the head. (see Rabbit punch)
 Striking downward using the point of the elbow. (see Elbow (strike))
 Throat strikes of any kind, including, without limitation, grabbing the trachea.
 Clawing, pinching or twisting the flesh.
 Grabbing the clavicle.
 Kicking the head of a grounded opponent.
 Kneeing the head of a grounded opponent.
 Stomping a grounded opponent.
 Kicking to the kidney with the heel.
 Spiking an opponent to the canvas on his head or neck. (see piledriver (professional wrestling))
 Throwing an opponent out of the ring or fenced area.
 Holding the shorts or gloves of an opponent.
 Spitting at an opponent.
 Engaging in an unsportsmanlike conduct that causes an injury to an opponent.
 Holding the ropes or the fence.
 Using abusive language in the ring or fenced area.
 Attacking an opponent on or during the break.
 Attacking an opponent who is under the care of the referee.
 Attacking an opponent after the bell has sounded the end of the period of unarmed combat.
 Flagrantly disregarding the instructions of the referee.
 Timidity, including, without limitation, avoiding contact with an opponent, intentionally or consistently dropping the mouthpiece or faking an injury.
 Interference by the corner.
 Throwing in the towel during competition.

When a foul is charged, the referee in their discretion may deduct one or more points as a penalty. If a foul incapacitates a fighter, then the match may end in a disqualification if the foul was intentional, or a no contest if unintentional. If a foul causes a fighter to be unable to continue later in the bout, it ends with a technical decision win to the injured fighter if the injured fighter is ahead on points, otherwise it is a technical draw.

EFC champions

Championship history

Heavyweight World Championship
206 to 265 lbs (93 to 120 kg)

Light Heavyweight World Championship
186 to 205 lbs (84 to 93 kg)

Middleweight World Championship
171 to 185 lbs (77 to 84 kg)

Welterweight World Championship
156 to 170 lbs (70 to 77 kg)

Lightweight World Championship
146 to 155 lbs (66 to 70 kg)

Featherweight World Championship
136 to 145 lbs (61 to 66 kg)

Bantamweight World Championship
126 to 135 lbs (57 to 61 kg)

Flyweight World Championship
116 to 125 lbs (53 to 67 kg)

Women's Flyweight World Championship
 to

Women's Strawweight World Championship
Under

Notable athletes and alumni
 Garreth McLellan: Former EFC Middleweight champion who was signed by the UFC in 2015. He competed in 5 UFC bouts from April 2015 until March 2017.
 Ruan Potts: Former 2 times EFC Heavyweight champion who was signed by the UFC in 2014 He competed in 3 UFC bouts from May 2014 until February 2015.
 Cyril Asker: Former EFC Heavyweight champion who was  signed by the UFC in 2016. To date he has competed in 5 UFC bouts.
 Danny Henry: Former 2 times EFC Featherweight champion who was  signed by the UFC in 2017. In his debut match at UFC Fight Night: Nelson vs. Ponzinibbio he earned a Fight of the night bonus. To date he has competed in 4 UFC bouts.
Dalcha Lungiambula: Former EFC Heavyweight and Light Heavyweight champion who was invited to compete in the UFC in 2019. To date he has competed in 3 UFC bouts.
 Dricus du Plessis: Former EFC Middleweight and Welterweight champion who was invited to compete in the UFC in September 2020. He made his promotional debut against Markus Perez on 11 October 2020 at UFC Fight Night 179 and won via a TKO in the first round. Du Plessis was scheduled to face Trevin Giles on March 20, 2021 at UFC on ESPN 21, but had to withdraw from the event after being refused entry to the US due to Covid related restrictions placed on South Africans.
Jared Vanderaa: Former EFC Heavyweight champion who was signed to the UFC in November 2020 after competing in the fourth season of Dana White's Contender Series. He was scheduled to fight Sergey Spivak at UFC 256 on December 12, 2020. However, Vanderaa tested positive to Covid 19 and was therefore removed from the event. The bout was re-scheduled for UFC Fight Night: Blaydes vs. Lewis on February 20, 2021. Vanderaa lost via TKO in the 2nd round.
Manon Fiorot Former EFC women's Lightweight champion and winner of the EFC's second season of the reality program - The Fighter. She was signed to the UFC in December 2020 and made her debut against Victoria Leonardo at UFC Fight Night: Chiesa vs. Magny on January 20, 2021. Fiorot won via TKO in the second round.

Other EFC athletes signed to the UFC 

 Don Madge. Former 2 times EFC Lightweight champion who was invited to compete in the UFC in 2018. In his debut match at UFC Fight Night 138 he earned a "Performance of the night" bonus with a knockout via a head kick. To date he has competed in 2 UFC bouts - UFC Fight Night 138 and UFC 242: Khabib vs. Poirier. Madge was scheduled to face Nasrat Haqparast at UFC Fight Night: Edwards vs. Muhammad on March 13, 2021 but had to withdraw from the event after being refused entry to the US due to Covid related restrictions placed on South Africans.
 JP Buys Former EFC Flyweight and Bantamweight champion who was invited to compete in UFC owner Dana White 's Tuesday Night Contender Series in August 2017 and again in the fourth season in November 2020. After beating his opponent in the final fight of the fourth season on November 17, 2020, Buys was signed to the UFC. He made his UFC debut against Bruno Gustavo da Silva at UFC on ESPN: Brunson vs. Holland on March 20. 2021, losing by TKO. He is now 0–3 in the promotion with losses from Montel Jackson and Cody Durden.
Nkazimulo Zulu. Former two times EFC Flyweight champion and current EFC competitor who was invited in 2016 to compete in The Ultimate Fighter which was produced by the UFC and Fox Sports 1. Zulu competed on The Ultimate Fighter Season 24, Opening Round, Day 2.

Reality shows

The Fighter: Season 1 
EFC launched a reality TV show on October 14, 2017 called The Fighter. Housed in a villa in Johannesburg, South Africa, 10 male MMA Middleweight prospects from around the world lived and trained together, as well as competed against one another for a  multiple fight contract and a guaranteed EFC title fight. They were split into two teams each coached by an experienced EFC athlete. The Fighter was broadcast on global television in 10 one-hour episodes. It was concluded on December 16, 2017 at EFC 66 with The Fighter title bout taking place between the two finalists followed by a bout between the two coaches

The Fighter: Season 2 
Following the success and positive reception to The Fighter: Season 1, EFC launched The Fighter: Season 2 on April 26, 2019. It followed the same format as Season 1 but with 10 female MMA Flyweight athletes from around the world instead. They were housed in Rosebank, South Africa, where they trained together and competed against one another in a quest to win a multiple fight contract and a guaranteed EFC title fight. As with Season 1, the competitors were split into two teams each coached by an experienced EFC athlete. Season 2 was also broadcast on global television in 10 one-hour episodes. It was concluded on June 29, 2019 at EFC 80 with The Fighter Season 2 title bout taking place between the two finalists followed by a bout between the two coaches.

Subsidiary companies 
EFC owns the following companies:
 EFC Gym
 EFC Performance Institute

Upcoming events

Following EFC 84, EFC 85 was scheduled to take place on April 4, 2020 at Grand West Casino in Cape Town. However, in early March, the President of South Africa - Cyril Ramaphosa - restricted public gatherings to less than 100 people due to the COVID-19 pandemic. The event was then relocated to the much smaller venue of the EFC Performance Institute and was to take place in front of a small group of spectators while being broadcast on all usual channels. On March 23, 2020, President Ramaphosa announced a nationwide 21 day level five lockdown prohibiting all such events among other restrictions from taking place until April 16, 2020. The lockdown was extended until May 1 after which it was again extended with level four restrictions. EFC 85 has been postponed until further notice.

References

External links 
Official website

2009 establishments in South Africa
Mixed martial arts organizations
Sport in South Africa
Sports organizations established in 2009
Organisations based in Johannesburg
Sport in Johannesburg